Frank Thornton Ball (15 January 192116 March 2013), professionally known as Frank Thornton, was an English actor. He was best known for playing Captain Peacock in the TV sitcom Are You Being Served? and its sequel Grace & Favour (Are You Being Served? Again!) and as Herbert "Truly" Truelove in TV sitcom Last of the Summer Wine.

Early life
Frank Thornton Ball was born in Dulwich, London, the son of Rosina Mary (née Thornton) and William Ernest Ball. His father was an organist at St Stephen's Church, Sydenham Hill, where Frank learned to play the organ for a short while. Music proved too difficult for him, however, and he wanted to act from an early age. 

His father, who worked in a bank, wanted him to get a "proper" job, so he began working in insurance after leaving Alleyn's School. He soon enrolled at a small acting school, the London School of Dramatic Art, and took evening classes. After two years working at the insurance company, he was invited to become a day student at the acting school and persuaded his father to finance his studies.

During the Second World War, Thornton was evacuated along with the drama school, and his first job was touring with four plays in Ireland, beginning in County Tipperary. After that he served as an airman in the Royal Air Force before ending the war as an officer. From the rank of leading aircraftman he was commissioned as a pilot officer on probation (emergency) on 1 December 1944. On 1 June 1945 his commission was confirmed and he was promoted to flying officer (war substantive). He was demobilised in 1947.

Marriage
On 5 June 1945, Thornton married actress Beryl Evans in West Wickham. The couple had a daughter, Jane.

Career

Almost immediately after demobilisation, Thornton joined a repertory company. He appeared in the farce The Party Spirit in the West End alongside Robertson Hare and Ralph Lynn. His first credited screen role was in the film Radio Cab Murder (1954). After working on stage and in  a few films during the 1950s, he became a familiar face on British television, specialising in comedy but initially starred in the TV series William Tell as Heinburgher in episode 23, "The Surgeon".

He was a regular on It's a Square World, and appeared in British sitcoms such as Hancock ("The Blood Donor", 1961), Steptoe and Son, Sykes, The Goodies and Love Thy Neighbour. He appeared in the Danger Man episode "The Assassin" as Pepe in 1961, and as a tailor in The Sentimental Agent episode 'Scroll of Islam' (1963). He worked with Dick Emery, Benny Hill, Frankie Howerd, Harry Worth, Reg Varney and Spike Milligan in their comedy shows and appeared in five episodes of Steptoe and Son during its first run from 1962 to 1965, and appeared in the film Steptoe and Son Ride Again (1973) and the 1973 television Christmas special, 'The Party'.

From 1966 to 1968, he starred in the BBC radio comedy The Embassy Lark, a spin-off of The Navy Lark. He appeared in at least one episode of The Navy Lark as CPO Nathanial Pertwee, filling in for Jon Pertwee who was indisposed. He also appeared in at least one episode of The Navy Lark as his character from The Embassy Lark.

In 1969, he starred in The Big Business Lark which ran for one season of thirteen episodes. This was not strictly a spin-off from The Navy Lark, other than being another "Lark" written by Lawrie Wyman.  He continued to appear in films, mostly comedies, during the 1960s and 1970s, including Carry On Screaming!, The Early Bird, The Big Job, The Bed Sitting Room, Up the Chastity Belt, Some Will, Some Won't, A Funny Thing Happened on the Way to the Forum and No Sex Please, We're British, as well as television sitcom spin-offs. He appeared in The Private Life of Sherlock Holmes (1970) as the one-armed doorman for the Diogenes Club. In 1974, he made a rare dramatic appearance as Prince Albert in the second episode of Fall of Eagles.

Thornton was best known for playing Captain Peacock in the long-running BBC comedy series Are You Being Served? from 1972 to 1985. He reprised his role for Grace & Favour from 1992 to 1993. In 1984 he starred as Sir John Treymane in the hit London musical Me and My Girl, earning rave reviews and an Olivier Award nomination. He also guest-starred in an episode of the BBC Radio series of Dad's Army entitled "Ten Seconds from Now" as the BBC producer Willoughby Maxwell-Troughton, who has to coordinate the chaotic platoon as it tries to broadcast to the nation in a morale-boosting Gang Show-style extravaganza.

In 1980, he joined John Cleese in the BBC Television Shakespeare production of The Taming of the Shrew. In the 1990s, he appeared as The Major-General (Stanley) in a production of The Pirates Of Penzance at the London Palladium.

In 1997, he took the role of Herbert "Truly" Truelove in Last of the Summer Wine, replacing Brian Wilde, who had suggested him for the role. He can also be seen in the film Gosford Park (2001) as Mr Burkett. Thornton was the subject of This Is Your Life in 1998, when he was surprised by Michael Aspel at Pinewood Studios.

Death
Thornton died from natural causes peacefully in his sleep at his home in Barnes, London, on 16 March 2013, aged 92.

Selected filmography

 Radio Cab Murder (1954) – Inspector Finch
 Stock Car (1955) - Doctor
 Portrait of Alison (1955) – Police Photographer
 Johnny, You're Wanted (1956)
 Cloak Without Dagger (1956) – Mr. Markley
 Battle of the V-1 (1958) – British Scientist (uncredited)
 The Tell-Tale Heart (1960) – Barman (uncredited)
 The Impersonator (1961) – Police Sergeant (uncredited)
 Victim (1961) – George – Henry's Assistant (uncredited)
 Tarnished Heroes (1961) – Trench Officer
 Trial and Error (1962) – TV Director
 The Dock Brief (1962) – Photographer at Fowle Wedding
 The Wild Affair (1964) – Manager
 The Comedy Man (1964) – Producer (uncredited)
 The Tomb of Ligeia (1964) – Peperel
 The Big Job (1965) – Bank Official
 The Early Bird (1965) – Drunken Doctor
 The Murder Game (1965) – Radio Announcer
 Gonks Go Beat (1965) – Mr. A&R
 Carry On Screaming! (1966) – Mr. Jones
 A Funny Thing Happened on the Way to the Forum (1966) – Roman Sentry #1
 Lucy in London (1966) 
 30 Is a Dangerous Age, Cynthia (1968) – Registrar
 The Bliss of Mrs. Blossom (1968) – Factory manager
 A Flea in Her Ear (1968) – Charles the Butler
 Till Death Us Do Part (1969) – Valuation Officer
 The Assassination Bureau (1969) – Elevator victim Count von Kissen (uncredited)
 Crooks and Coronets (1969) – Cyril
 The Bed Sitting Room (1969) – The BBC
 The Magic Christian (1969) – Police Inspector (uncredited)
 Some Will, Some Won't (1970) – Purvis
 The Private Life of Sherlock Holmes (1970) – Porter
 The Rise and Rise of Michael Rimmer (1970) – Tom Stoddart
 All the Way Up (1970) – Mr. Driver
 Up the Chastity Belt (1971) – Master of Ceremonies
 Bless This House (1972) – Mr Jones
 That's Your Funeral (1972) – Town Clerk
 Our Miss Fred (1972) – British Colonel
 Steptoe and Son Ride Again (1973) – Mr. Russell
 No Sex Please, We're British (1973) – Glass Shop Manager
 Digby, the Biggest Dog in the World (1973) – Estate Agent
 The Three Musketeers (1973) – Man in Small Carriage (uncredited)
 Keep It Up, Jack (1973) – Mr. Clarke
 Vampira (1974) – Mr. King
 Side by Side (1975) – Inspector Crumb
 Spanish Fly (1975) – Dr. Johnson
 The Bawdy Adventures of Tom Jones (1976) – Whitlow
 Are You Being Served? (1977) – Captain Peacock
 The BFG (1989) – Mr. Tibbs (voice)
 Gosford Park (2001) – Mr. Burkett
 Back in Business (2007) – Gardener
 Run for Your Wife (2013) – Man getting off bus (final film role)

References

External links
 

 

1921 births
2013 deaths
Male actors from London
English male film actors
English male radio actors
English male stage actors
English male television actors
People educated at Alleyn's School
People from Dulwich
20th-century English male actors
21st-century English male actors
Royal Air Force personnel of World War II
Royal Air Force officers
British male comedy actors
Burials at St Paul's Cathedral